Spangereid is a former municipality that was located in the old Vest-Agder county in Norway.  The  municipality existed from 1889 until its dissolution in 1964. The municipality was located in the southwestern part of the present-day municipality of Lindesnes in Agder county. The municipality included the whole Lindesnes peninsula, plus part of the mainland adjacent to the narrow isthmus which connects the peninsula to the mainland. The administrative centre was the village of Høllen where the Spangereid Church is located.

The area is one of Norway's richest archaeological sites. The abundant remnants from the Bronze Age and Viking Age show the Spangereid was a very important place at that time. Spangereid is strategically connected at the Lindesnes peninsula, Norway's southernmost point, where the east coast meets the west coast.

Name
The municipality (originally the parish) was named after the old Spangereid farm. This is where the local Spangereid Church was located.

History
The municipality of Spangereid was established on 1 January 1899 when it was separated from the municipality of Sør-Undal. The initial population of the new municipality was 1,734. During the 1960s, there were many municipal mergers across Norway due to the work of the Schei Committee. On 1 January 1963, the Gitlevåg area (population: 103) of Spangereid was transferred to the neighboring municipality of Lyngdal. On 1 January 1964, Spangereid (population: 899) was merged with Sør-Audnedal and Vigmostad to form the new municipality of Lindesnes.

Government
All municipalities in Norway, including Spangereid, are responsible for primary education (to 10th grade), outpatient health services, senior citizen services, unemployment and other social services, zoning, economic development, and municipal roads.  The municipality was governed by a municipal council of elected representatives, which in turn elected a mayor.

Municipal council
The municipal council  of Spangereid was made up of representatives that were elected to four year terms.  The party breakdown of the final municipal council was as follows:

Media gallery

See also
List of former municipalities of Norway

References

External links

Informational webside about Spangereid 

Lindesnes
Archaeological sites in Norway
Former municipalities of Norway
1899 establishments in Norway
1964 disestablishments in Norway